The Vevey–Les Pléiades railway line is a  railway line in the canton of Vaud, Switzerland. The line is owned and operated by Transports Montreux–Vevey–Riviera (MVR). It was originally built by the Chemins de fer électriques Veveysans (CEV).

History 

The CEV and three other companies merged to become the Transports Montreux–Vevey–Riviera on 1 January 2001.

Notes

References 
 

Railway lines in Switzerland
Metre gauge railways in Switzerland
Transport in Vevey
Transport in the canton of Vaud
Railway lines opened in 1902
900 V DC railway electrification